The Mercer West Tower is a 30-story,  high-rise condominium building located on Sage Street in the uptown district of Houston, Texas, United States. The building is the first of two towers that are part of the Mercer Towers complex. The tower is the 45th tallest building in the city.

Overview 
The Mercer West Tower opened in 2003, after being constructed in less than one year. The building was designed by architectural firm EDI Architecture. Developed by Genesis Real Estate Group, Dallas, Tx. The top five floors of the building has one  residence with a private elevator on each level.

Originally planned as twin towers, most of the windows of the Mercer West tower face north. The windows of the planned east tower located adjacent to the west tower would have also faced north.

School zoning 
The building is within the Houston Independent School District boundary. The building is assigned to St. George Place Elementary School, Grady Middle School, and Lee High School. Residents have Lamar and Westside high schools as options.

See also 

 List of tallest buildings in Houston
 List of tallest buildings in Texas

References

External links
 The Mercer West Tower

Residential condominiums in the United States
Residential buildings completed in 2003
Residential skyscrapers in Houston
Twin towers